The 2011 season was the San Diego Chargers' 42nd in the National Football League and their 52nd overall. The team failed to improve on its 9–7 record from 2010, and finished in a three-way tie with the Denver Broncos and Oakland Raiders for the AFC West division title, with an 8–8 record, but lost the tiebreaker to the Broncos and missed the playoffs for a second consecutive season. For Norv Turner, this was his fifth season as the head coach of the Chargers. The Chargers had the 18th pick in the 2011 NFL Draft.

Offseason

Coaching changes
On January 11, defensive coordinator Ron Rivera became the new head coach of the Carolina Panthers. That same day, Rich Bisaccia was named the team's new special teams' coach, replacing Steve Crosby, whose contract was not renewed. Three days later (January 14), the team hired former San Francisco 49ers' defensive coordinator Greg Manusky to replace Rivera. Manusky previously served as the Chargers' linebackers coach from 2002 to 2006.

Arrivals

Departures

NFL Draft

Draft notes

Preseason

Schedule

Regular season

Schedule

Game summaries

Week 1: vs. Minnesota Vikings

Coming off their special teams woes in 2010, the Chargers allowed a 103-yard opening kickoff return to Percy Harvin to start the season. Kicker Nate Kaeding suffered a season-ending injury on the play, and punter Mike Scifres assumed place kicking responsibilities for the game. The Chargers outscored the Vikings 10–0 in the fourth quarter to come back and win the game, 24–17. Fullback Mike Tolbert scored three touchdowns, and Philip Rivers completed 33 of 48 passes for 335 yards and two touchdowns. He was also intercepted twice. Scifres kicked a 40-yard field goal, the first of his NFL career, and kicked three PATs. With the win, the Chargers started their season out 1–0.

Week 2: at New England Patriots

With the loss, the Chargers fell to 1–1.

Week 3: vs. Kansas City Chiefs

With the win, the Chargers improved to 2–1.

Week 4: vs. Miami Dolphins

With the win, the Chargers improved to 3–1.

Week 5: at Denver Broncos

With the win, the Chargers went into their bye week at 4–1. The team also managed to get their best start after five games under head coach Norv Turner.

Week 7: at New York Jets

With the loss, the Chargers fell to 4–2.

Week 8: at Kansas City Chiefs

With the loss, the Chargers fell to 4–3.

Week 9: vs. Green Bay Packers

With the loss, the Chargers fell to 4–4.

Week 10: vs. Oakland Raiders

Trying to snap a three-game losing streak, the Chargers stayed at home for a Week 10 AFC West duel with the Oakland Raiders on Thursday night. San Diego struck first in the opening quarter with a 20-yard field goal from kicker Nick Novak, but the Raiders answered with running back Michael Bush getting a 2-yard touchdown run. Oakland added onto their lead in the second quarter with kicker Sebastian Janikowski getting a 23-yard field goal, followed by quarterback Carson Palmer completing a 33-yard touchdown pass to wide receiver Denarius Moore.

The Chargers began the third quarter with quarterback Philip Rivers finding rookie wide receiver Vincent Brown on a 30-yard touchdown pass, but the Raiders struck back with Palmer completing a 26-yard touchdown pass to Moore. Afterwards, San Diego closed out the quarter with Rivers hooking up with fullback Jacob Hester on a 7-yard touchdown pass. The Chargers tried to rally in the fourth quarter, but Oakland's defense held on to preserve the win.

Win the loss, not only did San Diego fall to 4–5, but it marked the first time since 2003 that the Chargers had lost four-straight.

Week 11: at Chicago Bears

With the loss, the Chargers fell to 4–6 and lost 5 in a row for the first time since 2003.

Week 12: vs. Denver Broncos

The loss was the sixth consecutive for the Chargers, their longest such streak in 10 years which took their record down to 4–7.

Week 13: at Jacksonville Jaguars

Hoping to snap a six-game losing streak, the Chargers flew to EverBank Field for a Week 13 Monday night duel with the Jacksonville Jaguars. San Diego delivered the game's opening punch with a 13-yard touchdown run from running back Mike Tolbert, followed by a 29-yard field goal from kicker Nick Novak. The Jaguars would answer in the second quarter with quarterback Blaine Gabbert completing a 9-yard touchdown pass to running back Maurice Jones-Drew and a 5-yard touchdown pass to wide receiver Cecil Shorts, yet the Chargers replied with quarterback Philip Rivers connecting with rookie wide receiver Vincent Brown on a 22-yard touchdown pass and a 35-yard touchdown pass to wide receiver Vincent Jackson.

San Diego added onto its lead in the third quarter with Rivers hooking up with wide receiver Malcom Floyd on a 52-yard touchdown pass. Afterwards, the Bolts would pull away in the fourth quarter with a 31-yard touchdown run from running back Ryan Matthews.

With the win, the Chargers improved to 5–7.

Week 14: vs. Buffalo Bills

With the win, the Chargers improved to 6–7.

Week 15: vs. Baltimore Ravens

With the win, the Chargers improved to 7–7. Qualcomm Stadium was renamed Snapdragon Stadium as a promotion for Qualcomm’s Snapdragon brand.

Week 16: at Detroit Lions

With the loss, the Chargers fell to 7–8.

Week 17: at Oakland Raiders

With the win, the Chargers wrapped up their season at 8–8 and snapped their three-game losing streak against the Raiders.

Standings

Staff

Final roster

Notes and references

San Diego
San Diego Chargers seasons
2011 in sports in California